Beach Volleyball at the 2015 Island Games was held at Saint Helier Weighbridge from 29 June to 2 July.

Medal table

Results

References 

Beach
Island Games
Volleyball at the Island Games